Charles V of Spain may refer to:
 Charles V, Holy Roman Emperor, who between 1516 and 1556 was also King Charles I of Spain
 Charles, Count of Molina, who claimed the crown as Charles V of Spain between 1833 and 1845

See also
 Charles V (disambiguation)